Anonychomyrma dimorpha is a species of ant in the genus Anonychomyrma. Described by Viehmeyer in 1912, the species is endemic to New Guinea and the Solomon Islands.

References

Anonychomyrma
Insects of New Guinea
Insects described in 1912